

A
A Global Threat
Antidote
The Analogs

B
Blaggers I.T.A.
The Blood
The Briggs
The Boils

C
The Casualties
Career Soldiers
Cheap Sex
Clit 45
Cock Sparrer

D
Defiance
The Distillers
The Devotchkas
Disclose
Disfear
Dogsflesh
Driller Killer
Dropkick Murphys
The Ducky Boys

F
Foreign Legion

H
Hardsell

K
Klasse Kriminale

L
Los Fastidios
Lower Class Brats
Litmus Green

M
Major Accident

O
One Man Army
Oxymoron

P
Picture Frame Seduction
 The Press

R
The Rabble
Rancid
Ratos de Porão
Red London
The Restarts
Roger Miret and the Disasters
Rux

S
Street Dogs
SS-Kaliert
Swingin' Utters

T
Time Again
Total Chaos
Totalitär

U
The Unseen
U.S. Bombs
U.K. Subs

V
The Virus

W
Wolfbrigade

 
Lists of hardcore punk bands